The  was the first in which Minamoto no Yoritomo,  who became shōgun less than a decade later, was commander of the Minamoto forces. The battle was fought on September 14, 1180, in the southwest of present-day Odawara, Kanagawa Prefecture, near Yoritomo's headquarters at Kamakura.

Background
Minamoto no Yoritomo was exiled by the leader of the Taira clan, Taira no Kiyomori, following the Heiji Rebellion of 1160. In the following years, the Taira clan attempted to consolidate their position, eventually forcing the Emperor Takakura to abdicate in favour of his infant son, Antoku, whose mother was a Taira. Prince Mochihito, brother of Emperor Takakura, felt that the Taira had denied his rightful claim to the throne, and in May 1180, issued an appeal to the Minamoto clan to rise against the Taira. As Yorimoto was married into the Hōjō clan, they helped fund his petition to claim himself as the head of the Minamoto clan.

When Kiyomori heard that Yoritomo had left Izu Province for the Hakone Pass, he appointed Ōba Kagechika to stop him. Although there was much sympathy for Yoritomo's call to arms, the clans were wary of openly supporting him, and an army of only 300 gathered at Ishibashiyama where he had raised his standard. A force from the Miura clan, was prevented from reaching Yoritomo due to poor weather conditions which caused the Sakawa River near Kamakura to flood.

Battle
Ōba Kagechika launched a night attack during a heavy rain on the Minamoto camp with 3,000 men. A further 300 under Itō Sukechika skirted around the camp and attacked from the rear, blocking the Minamoto forces between them. The defenders were aided by elements of Ōba's forces who were secretly loyal to the Minamoto and could disrupt the battle without detection in the dark and stormy conditions. Despite being heavily outnumbered, the Minamoto forces put up a strong fight. During the fighting, Yorimoto's brother-in-law Hōjō Munetoki was killed. The imbalance in fighters eventually forced Minamoto to make a retreat. The retreat culminated in a final stand by Yoritomo and a single companion near a hollow tree. When all was lost, Yoritomo was said to have hidden inside the tree trunk with his companion. They were found by one of his secret allies and smuggled from the battlefield. Yoritomo fled by sea from Cape Manazuru to the Bōsō Peninsula in Awa Province in the south of present-day Chiba Prefecture on September 28, 1180.

References

Ishibashiyama 1180
Ishibashiyama
Ishibashiyama
1180s in Japan
1180 in Asia